The individual show jumping at the 1976 Summer Olympics took place on 27 July. The event was open to men and women. The individual show jumping event consisted of two rounds, held separately from the team competition. The top 20 riders from the first round qualified for the second round, both rounds were then combined to determine placement, if tied a jump-off between all tied riders would determine the winners. There were 47 competitors from 20 nations. The event was won by Alwin Schockemöhle of West Germany, the nation's first medal in individual jumping as a separate team (both Germany and the United Team of Germany had won a gold medal before). Canada also earned its first medal in the event, with Michel Vaillancourt's silver. François Mathy's bronze was Belgium's first medal in the event since 1912. Great Britain's podium streak in individual jumping ended at four Games, as Debbie Johnsey took fourth after reaching a three-way jump-off against Vaillancourt and Mathy but coming last out of the jump-off.

Background

This was the 15th appearance of the event, which had first been held at the 1900 Summer Olympics and has been held at every Summer Olympics at which equestrian sports have been featured (that is, excluding 1896, 1904, and 1908). It is the oldest event on the current programme, the only one that was held in 1900. The team and individual events remained separated, as they had been starting in 1968.

Five of the top 10 (top 12, after ties) riders from the 1972 competition returned: gold medalist Graziano Mancinelli of Italy, fourth-place finishers Jim Day of Canada and Hugo Simon of Austria, seventh-place finisher Jean-Marcel Rozier of France, and eighth-place finisher Alfonso Segovia of Spain. Also returning were the brothers Piero D'Inzeo and Raimondo D'Inzeo. Raimondo had won the 1960 gold and 1956 silver medals; Piero had won the 1960 silver and 1956 bronze medals. The brothers were competing in their eighth (and final) Olympics, the first people to appear in eight Games. The 1956 gold medalist Hans Günter Winkler of West Germany was also competing again after not participating in 1972. Hartwig Steenken, also of West Germany, was the reigning World Champion but did not compete in Montreal.

Guatemala and Puerto Rico each made their debut in the event. France competed for the 14th time, most of any nation, having missed the individual jumping only in 1932.

Competition format

The competition used the two-round format introduced in 1952, with the elimination feature added in 1968. The top 20 riders from the first round qualified for the second round, both rounds were then combined to determine placement, if tied a jump-off between all tied riders would determine the winners.

Schedule

All times are Eastern Daylight Time (UTC-4)

Results

Schockemöhle was the first rider to achieve a clean run in both rounds since the competition moved to the two-round format in 1952.

References

Equestrian at the 1976 Summer Olympics